Marianne Deborah Williamson (born July 8, 1952) is an American author, spiritual leader, political activist, and candidate for president of the United States. A frequent guest on The Oprah Winfrey Show, she is the author of fourteen books, including four New York Times number one bestsellers. She is also the founder of Project Angel Food, a volunteer food delivery program that serves home-bound people with HIV/AIDS and life-threatening illnesses, as well as the co-founder of the Peace Alliance, a nonprofit education and advocacy organization.

In 2014, Williamson unsuccessfully ran as an independent representing California's 33rd congressional district in the United States House of Representatives.

On January 9, 2019, she announced her campaign for the Democratic nomination in the 2020 United States presidential election and suspended her campaign on January 10, 2020. She later endorsed Bernie Sanders at a rally in Austin, Texas, on February 23, 2020. On February 23, 2023, she stated that she plans to run for president again in the 2024 Democratic presidential primaries, challenging incumbent president Joe Biden. She launched her campaign on March 4, 2023.

Early life and education
Williamson was born in Houston, Texas, in 1952. She was the youngest of three children of Samuel "Sam" Williamson, a World War II veteran and immigration lawyer, and Sophie Ann Kaplan, a homemaker and community volunteer.

Williamson was raised in an upper-middle-class family that practiced Conservative Judaism. Her family attended Congregation Beth Yeshurun. She learned about world religions and social justice at home, but first became interested in speaking from the pulpit on social matters when she saw her rabbi speak against the Vietnam War. Her family also traveled internationally during the summers when she was a child. She has said that it was through travel that she "had an experience, at a young age, that people are the same everywhere."

Williamson attended Houston ISD's Bellaire High School. After graduating, she spent two years studying theater and philosophy at Pomona College in Claremont, California, where she was a roommate of eventual film producer Lynda Obst. In 1973, Williamson dropped out of college and lived "a nomadic existence" during what she calls "her wasted decade." She moved to New Mexico, where she took classes at the University of New Mexico and lived in a geodesic dome with her boyfriend. The couple broke up a year later. Marianne then moved to Austin, Texas, where she took classes at the University of Texas. After leaving Texas, she went to New York City, intending to pursue a career as a cabaret singer, but got distracted by "bad boys and good dope." Vanity Fair wrote that Williamson "spent her twenties in a growing state of existential despair". In New York, Williamson suffered from deep depression following the end of a relationship. She has said that this experience gave rise to a desire to spend the rest of her life helping people.

A Course in Miracles

In 1976, Williamson was at a party in New York and picked up a copy of Helen Schucman's book A Course in Miracles from a coffee table. She dismissed the book because, being Jewish, she was put off by its Christian terminology. Williamson then moved to San Francisco, where she developed an interest in spirituality, metaphysics, and meditation. She began reading the Course "passionately" and doing its 365 daily exercises. She also reconciled it with her Jewishness; in her view, "A conversion to Christ is not a conversion to Christianity. It is a conversion to a conviction of the heart. The Messiah is not a person but a point of view".

Williamson said that the book was her "path out of hell," as she had been "mired in a series of unhappy love affairs, alcohol and drug abuse, a nervous breakdown, and endless sessions with therapists."

The Course has often been described as a religion or pseudoreligion. Williamson disagrees:

Teaching

In 1979, Williamson returned to Houston, where she ran a metaphysical bookstore coffeeshop, sang Gershwin standards in a nightclub, got married and divorced "almost immediately," and underwent a "spiritual surrender".

In 1983, Williamson had what she has called a "flash" to close the coffeeshop and move to Los Angeles. She made the move with $1,000 in her pocket. She got an apartment in Hollywood, where her roommate was 17-year-old Laura Dern, who noted that Williamson "held prayer groups in our living room." Williamson got a job at the Philosophical Research Society. As part of their lecture series, she started speaking about A Course in Miracles as "a self-study program of spiritual psychotherapy."

Williamson's teachings stemmed from an inspirational message: "Divine love is the core and essence of every human mind." She saw this message as a remedy to misinterpretations of the Bible that, through an emphasis on sin and guilt, could lead to harm (e.g. slavery, depression, self-loathing). As word spread about "the young woman talking about a God who loves you, no matter what", she had to rent church space to accommodate the demand hear her speak. Four years later, she began lecturing monthly in New York. Eventually, she was invited to speak throughout the U.S. and Europe. Williamson did not charge for her lectures but had a "suggested donation" of $7 ($19 as of 2022) and a policy of not turning people away for lack of money.

Williamson's style was called a "trendy amalgam of Christianity, Buddhism, pop psychology and 12-step recovery wisdom". Williamson believed that she "filled a void left by the isolationism of established Christianity and Judaism.

Pastor
At the height of her popularity, in 1998, Williamson sold her $2.7 million home. She decided to stop teaching and join the ministry. She said, "I had a lot going on in my life. I just felt I had to leave. I had a baby."[failed verification] Williamson said that becoming a pastor was a way "to get dirt in her fingers again""to experience the day-to-day lives of hundreds of people"and would be helpful in her work as a spiritual guide.

Williamson became the "spiritual leader" for the Church of Today, a Unity Church in Warren, Michigan, where she had 2,300 congregants and 50,000 television viewers. She booked high-profile musical guests such as Aerosmith's Steven Tyler, expanded the bookstore, more than tripled declining church membership, increased the congregation's racial and sexual orientation diversity, brought the church out of mounting debt, and grew the church into one of the country's biggest Unity churches.

She resigned from the Church Renaissance Unity Interfaith Spiritual Fellowship in 2003.

Author

Williamson has written 13 books. Seven have been on the New York Times bestseller list, with four reaching number one. More than three million copies have been sold.
 A Politics of Love: A Handbook for a New American Revolution (2019)
 Tears to Triumph: The Spiritual Journey from Suffering to Enlightenment (2016)
 The Law of Divine Compensation: On Work, Money and Miracles (2012)
 A Year of Miracles: Daily Devotions and Reflections (2011)
 A Course in Weight Loss: 21 Spiritual Lessons for Surrendering Your Weight Forever (2010)
 The Age of Miracles: Embracing the New Midlife (2007)
On USA Todays best-seller list for four weeks, it is about how to approach midlife by not dwelling on lost youth but starting new opportunities.
 The Gift of Change: Further Reflections on a Course in Miracles (2004)
 Everyday Grace: Having Hope, Finding Forgiveness and Making Miracles (2002)
 Enchanted Love: The Mystical Power of Intimate Relationships (1999)
About building a spiritual relationship between partners, the book advocates "a new model of romance with love, righteousness, compassion."
 Healing the Soul of America: Reclaiming Our Voices as Spiritual Citizens (1997)
The book was originally titled The Healing of America. It is about developing more robust political engagement by laying out plans to "transform the American political consciousness and encourage powerful citizen involvement to heal our society" by turning spiritual activism into sociopolitical activism.
 A Woman's Worth (1993)
A New York Times bestseller that according to Publishers Weekly gave "sound, empowering advice on relationships, work, love, sex and childrearing." The Vancouver Sun used a passage from the book in summarizing it:

 Illuminata (1993)
On USA Today's best-seller list for 20 weeks, the book is about how prayer is practical in everyday life by looking to God to transcend life's pains.
 A Return to Love: Reflections on the Principles of A Course in Miracles (1992)
On The New York Times bestseller list for 39 weeks in the "Advice, How To and Miscellaneous" category, the book teaches that practicing love every day will bring more peace and fulfillment to one's life. Williamson wrote her most famous quote in this book, which is often misattributed to Nelson Mandela:

Oprah Winfrey said of the book, "I have never been more moved by a book than I am by this one." Winfrey bought 1,000 copies and encouraged her audience to purchase it, telling them that after reading it, she experienced 157 miracles. Williamson was a frequent guest on The Oprah Winfrey Show as well, and became known as Oprah's "spiritual advisor."

Social justice

In the 1980s Williamson began founding charities based on the principles in the Course.

Centers for Living
In 1987, inspired by a friend's struggle with breast cancer, Williamson launched the Center for Living, after a $50,000 donation from David Geffen. Williamson co-founded the organization with Louise Hay—a minister of the New Thought Church of Religious Science—who claimed to have healed herself of cancer. The Center primarily began assisting people afflicted with the rapidly-spreading (and then-unknown) epidemic of HIV/AIDS, particularly gay men, whom were openly welcomed when shunned and refused help by other organizations. The Center provided services such as housework, daily chores, meditation, massage, psychological counseling and emotional support throughout the city and county of Los Angeles.

In 1989, having received another advance of $50,000 from Geffen, Williamson opened a second Center for Living, this time in New York City; this location was hampered by conflict between staff and the board regarding Williamson's management style, which an anonymous former associate described as "very controlling." Unlike in Los Angeles, the more secular New York had requested for Williamson not to pray, fueling a further disconnect. 

A few months later, after two of Williamson’s board members told Vanity Fair that she wanted "to be famous", Williamson felt that she was being treated as "expendable". This notion would lead to the expulsion of several of her board members, including the then-head of the New York Center, as well as of film director Mike Nichols.

Williamson stepped down from her role at the Centers in the summer of 1992. The New York Center was able to remain open, following a generous donation from Cher. Williamson gave the organization an extra $50,000 check and left, but remained an advisor to the organization. It was reported that Williamson was “losing trust” in several board members, and “preemptively” fired them before her own potential downfall. She disputed this, claiming that she intended to “step down as President”, wishing to provide her successor with a “clean slate”.

Project Angel Food
In 1989, with the Centers’ success, Williamson launched Project Angel Food (a program operated by The Centers for Living) to support HIV/AIDS patients. By 1992, it had raised over $1.5 million, and was delivering nearly 400 hot meals a day to home-bound AIDS patients in Los Angeles.

Williamson resigned from Project Angel Food in March of 1992 amid infighting, two months after the board had fired executive director and gay activist Steve Schulte, the third executive director in the past five years, due to conflict to the approach taken in running the organization. Employees demanded the resignation of Williamson, his reinstatement and a replacement of the board, or unionization if Williamson did not resign. Stephen Bennett, a consultant hired to assess the situation, determined that there were more paid staff on hand than needed, but with a union vote pending, Bennett refused to lay employees off. It was determined that the best option was for Williamson to resign.

Project Angel Food employees did not unionize and the organization was able to remain operational after Williamson's departure, restructuring six months after her resignation. The organization briefly struggled as Williamson was the primary fundraiser.  By 1998 it had over 1,500 volunteers and nearly 1,000 clients. As of 2018, with expanded food, nutrition and counseling services, it delivered 12,000 meals weekly throughout Los Angeles and had 55 employees, over 3,000 volunteers, nearly 1,500 clients, and revenue of nearly $4 million. In 30 years Project Angel Food has provided and delivered 12 million meals. Williamson remains a trustee of the organization.

AIDS work
Williamson helped gay men who she said "were told that they weren't loved by their family and friends, employers, politicians, hospitals". Calling herself a "midwife to the dying", she officiated at funerals, drove men to their doctors, and paid for patients' AIDS medication.

During her 2020 presidential campaign, Williamson was accused of telling gay men not to take medication for AIDS, of implying that they were "not positive enough" to counter the disease, of telling them that they "deserved" the disease, and of telling them to "pray the AIDS away". She has repeatedly denied these accusations. Most of the accusations appeared to stem from excerpts or paraphrases of her 1992 book A Return to Love.

The Peace Alliance

In 1998 Williamson co-founded the non-profit Global Renaissance Alliance (GSA) with Conversations with God author Neale Donald Walsch. The organization established a network of "citizen salons" to pray for national growth, peace and liberal causes. According to Williamson, the GSA sat in small groups, "Peace Circles" of fewer than 12 people, every other week and prayed together.

In 2004 the GSA's name was changed to The Peace Alliance and it was given a new mandate focused on grassroots education and advocacy organization with the intent of increasing U.S. government support for peace-building approaches to domestic and international conflicts. The Peace Alliance taught peace activists how to lobby their congressional representatives.

The Alliance has raised over $100 million in funding for international peace-building. It has also helped get provisions of the Youth PROMISE Act, embedded in the Every Student Succeeds Act, passed into law. The California Democratic Party adopted key Peace Alliance priorities into its platform.

"Sister Giant" conferences
In 2010 Williamson launched "Sister Giant", a series of conferences to "start a new conversation about transformational politics" and encourage more women to run for office: Williamson saw herself as a "cheerleader," supporting women who had never been politically involved, on the campaign level, but who might be thinking, 'Why not me?'"

In 2012, Yale University's Women’s Campaign Schoolan independent, nonpartisan, issue-neutral political campaign training and leadership program hosted at Yale Law Schoolpartnered with the series, which focused on how to better address many social issues, including child poverty, campaign finance reform, and high incarceration rates.

RESULTS
For several years until 2017, Williamson was a board member of Results Educational Fund (RESULTS), a 501(c)(3) nonprofit charity dedicated to finding long-term solutions to poverty by focusing on its root causes, and its sister organization, Results Inc., a 501(c)(4) "social welfare" organization that encourages "grassroots advocates to lobby their elected officials" and works "directly with Congress and other U.S. policymakers to shape and advance" anti-poverty policies. The organization has 100 U.S. local chapters and works in six other countries.

Political career

2014 U.S. House of Representatives campaign

In 2014 Williamson ran as an Independent for California's 33rd congressional district in the U.S. House of Representatives. She was praised as a "tireless" campaigner but criticized for not articulating specifics in her plans.

Prominent elected and public officials endorsed her campaign, including Ben Cohen (of Ben & Jerry's Ice Cream); former governors Jennifer Granholm and Jesse Ventura; former representatives Dennis Kucinich and Alan Grayson; and Van Jones. Alanis Morissette wrote and performed Williamson's campaign song, "Today".

Williamson campaigned on progressive issues such as campaign finance reform, women's reproductive rights and LGBTQ equality. She raised $2.4 million, of which she personally contributed 25 percent.

Williamson finished fourth out of 18 candidates, with 14,335 votes or 13.2 percent of the vote (Republican Elan Carr finished first in the primary with 21.6 percent of the vote, but then lost the general election to the top vote-getting Democrat from the primary, Ted Lieu).

2020 presidential campaign

On November 15, 2018, Williamson announced the formation of a presidential exploratory committee in a video in which she said that there was a "miracle in this country in 1776 and we need another one [that would require] a co-creative effort, an effort of love and a gift of love, to our country and hopefully to our world."

On January 28, 2019, Williamson officially launched her presidential campaign, in front of 2,000 people in Los Angeles, and appointed Maurice Danielwho served alongside Donna Brazile in Dick Gephardt's campaign for the Democratic nomination in 1988as her national campaign manager. Her campaign committee, "Marianne Williamson for President", officially filed on February 4.

On February 16, Williamson's campaign announced the appointment of former Congressman Paul Hodes, who represented New Hampshire's 2nd congressional district from 2007 to 2011, as New Hampshire state director and senior campaign advisor.

As of May 1, Williamson had a campaign staff of 20 and, a week later, announced that she had received enough contributions from unique donors to enter the official primary debates. Her campaign had raised $1.5 million in the first quarter of 2019, during which it received donations from 46,663 unique individuals. Williamson subsequently met the polling criteria, with three unique polls at 1% from qualifying pollsters, on May 23.

In June, Williamson confirmed that she moved to Des Moines, Iowa, in advance of the 2020 caucuses. And in response to the Iowa Democratic Party's proposed creation of "virtual caucuses" in the 2020 race, Williamson's campaign announced that it would appoint 99 "Virtual Iowa Caucus Captains" (each assigned to a single county) to turn out supporters in both the virtual and in-person caucuses.

Later that month, Williamson participated in the first primary debate. The LA Times wrote that Democratic voters were "confused" and "transfixed" by Williamson, who declared that her first act as president would be to call New Zealand Prime Minister Jacinda Ardern and say, "Girlfriend, you are so on", a reference to Ardern's emphasis on building a country that treats its children well.

On July 30, Williamson participated in the second primary debate. She was the most Googled candidate in 49 of 50 states and received the fourth-most attention on Twitter. The spike in searches was prompted by her reference to the Flint water crisis (which she described as a "part of the dark underbelly of American society") and her assertion that President Trump was harnessing a "dark psychic force of the collectivized hatred" which she later described as racism, bigotry, antisemitism, homophobia, Islamophobia, and xenophobia propelled by social media.

On the day of the third DNC debate, for which she did not qualify, Williamson did an interview with Eric Bolling and expressed further frustration with the media when she thought she was not being recorded. Among her unscripted comments was "what does it say that Fox News is nicer to me than the lefties are?"

On January 10, Williamson announced the end of her campaign and pledged to support the Democratic nominee.

Many pundits treated Williamson's brief campaign as comic relief, such as Peter Wehner of The New York Times calling her "an amusing presence," or Alexandra Petri of The Washington Post writing, "We are all dreams in the mind of Marianne Williamson. If she stops believing in us even for a second, we will all vanish." However, some came to acknowledge that her message was ultimately persuasive and influential. After the July 30, 2019, Democratic debate, New York Times columnist Jamelle Bouie wrote, "It feels insane to say this, but Williamson out-debated virtually everyone else on the stage. She gave a compelling answer on reparations and returned again and again to the most important issue for Democratic voters, beating Trump."

2024 presidential campaign
Williamson began "working on putting a machine together" to run for president in 2024, visiting South Carolina and New Hampshire in early 2023. She said in a January 25 interview that she could run against Joe Biden in a presidential primary. On February 23, 2023, she confirmed that she would launch a run for president in the future. She started her 2024 campaign on March 4, 2023.

Political positions

Domestic issues

Disabled community
She supports the Individuals with Disabilities Education Act along with initiatives to guarantee voting rights and accessible polling to those with disabilities. She pledged to appoint disabled citizens to her cabinet. She also supported the Disability Integration Act requiring healthcare insurers to cover home healthcare. She pledged to try to get the Act passed in her first 100 days in office.

Williamson supports transition programs that move institutionalized people with disabilities to supported independent living. She also supports reforming Social Security Insurance to ensure that people with disabilities are not excluded from entitlement programs if they earn more than $1,220 a month. In addition, she supports including disability policy, including disabled human rights, in U.S. trade deals.

Williamson supports sex education in the disabled community, including sexual abuse reporting initiatives, and sensitivity training for police in regard to interacting with those with disabilities and mental illnesses.

Education
Williamson supports free tuition at public colleges, community colleges and trade schools. She also supports a "radical" reduction in college loan debt and total forgiveness of college loan debt "in some cases." She has expressed her support for treating student loans "like other debt", such that debtors could refinance at lower interest rates and those who declare bankruptcy could have their debt forgiven.

Families
Williamson supports paid leave (family, medical, pregnancy, and vacation), pay equity, government support for childcare services, union rights, and a universal basic income.

Williamson supports portable retirement plans, the development of initiatives to protect homeowners from predatory lending, an increase in access to home loan modifications, SNAP coverage for low-income families, and initiatives to understand and decrease homelessness among veterans.

Williamson also supports the creation of a Department of Children and Youtha new cabinet-level agency to create programs to reduce infant mortality, illness, food insecurity, homelessness, and undereducation.

Finance
Williamson supports corporations having a responsibility to stakeholders, not just to stockholders.

Williamson supports making middle-class tax cuts permanent and repealing the corporate tax cuts in the 2017 Tax Bill. She also supports the restoration and "modernization" of the Glass-Steagall Act, with the intent of separating commercial banks from investment banks in order to prevent banks from making risky investments. Williamson supports preventing corporations from engaging in tax avoidance, including tax avoidance for carried interest and ETF income. She also supports enforcement of antitrust laws and the implementation of a federal fee for financial transactions such as buying stocks or exchanging currency. Williamson also supports independent regulation of the pharmaceutical industry to prevent what she has called "predatory practices":

Guns
Williamson supports gun control, and has described the issue as one personal to her. On November 4, 2018, she gave a passionate keynote address to several hundred Muslim and Jewish women at the Sisterhood of Salaam-Shalom conference in Doylestown, Pennsylvania, eight days after 11 Jews were murdered at Pittsburgh's Tree of Life synagogue. As a Jewish woman, she argued against fear being used as a political force and advocated for love in its place.

Williamson supports eliminating the sale of assault rifles and semi-automatic weapons, banning bump stocks and high-capacity magazines, and eliminating the current limits on the Centers for Disease Control's ability to track and record gun ownership numbers. She also supports mandatory universal background checks and waiting periods for all gun dealersincluding at gun shows and sporting retailerschild safety locks on all guns, and restrictions on the ability of the mentally ill to buy guns.

Williamson also supports Red Flag Laws and making the process of obtaining gun licenses similar to that of obtaining driver's licenses.

Health care
Williamson supports universal health care under a "Medicare for All type of plan." She has also stated that she supports extending health coverageincluding coverage for home careto currently uninsured Americans.

Williamson has expressed that she would like to develop a "health care" system opposed to what she says is a "disease management" system that the U.S. currently has. Inclusive of that, Williamson has expressed support for reimbursement of medical professionals for wellness and preventive care, longer doctor visits, nutrition and lifestyle education and limiting the marketing of hyper-processed and sugary foods. She has also expressed support for ending subsidies to the agricultural production of "unhealthy" food in favor of "healthy" food production.

Williamson supports expanding the role of the EPA and FDA to regulate toxin inclusion in the environment and food supplies, to make recommendations of how to lower societal stress, and to help develop healthy habits in local communities. She also supports limiting the profit motive in medicine as much as possible, being inclusive of seeking non-pharmacological ways to treat mental-health issues (where possible), and treating mental-health as important as physical health in order to normalize treatment.

Williamson expressed that she also supports treating drug addiction as a mental-health issue and de-criminalizing drugs.

Immigration
Williamson supports a full path to citizenship for undocumented immigrants with no "serious" criminal background. She also supports reducing the cost of naturalization and increasing resources to help immigrants navigate the process with more ease.

Whereas Williamson does not support open borders, she supports a more humane approach to border policy. In June 2019, Williamson ripped then-President Donald Trump on his immigration policies after reports of children being separated from their families and being put in a detainment center, calling them "state-sponsored crimes". After Trump's announcement that ICE would begin mass-deportations, she said it is "no different" than what Jewish people faced in Nazi Germany.

Williamson supports investing in "smart" border security, which she states, calls for better monitoring of airplanes, ships, trucks crossing the border, and submarines. She also supports overturning the three-year and ten-year re-entry bars.

Williamson also supports Deferred Action for Childhood Arrivals (DACA) and expanding protections and naturalization to undocumented immigrants who were brought here as children, regardless of their current age.

LGBTQ community
Williamson supports The Equality Act. She also supports equality in health care, housing, employment, and services. She has also expressed support in protecting the LGBTQ community from marginalization due to Census questionnaire.

Minimum wage
Williamson supports an increase of the federal minimum wage to $15 per hour. She also supports increasing the minimum wage for localities based on an amount determined to be a living wage for a given geographical area, and then adjusting that wage for inflation as needed.

National security
Williamson supports "redesigning" the partnership between the Defense Department and the State Department that would elevate the need for peace, putting it on equal footing with the need for military preparedness. Williamson supports the creation of a United States Department of Peace to aid in her proposed redesign, which also includes a plan to establish a Peace Academy modeled after military academies.

In her 2014 Congressional campaign, Williamson supported dismantling the National Security Agency (NSA).

Williamson supports decreasing the military budget and redirecting those funds toward peacebuilding and peace maintenance efforts e.g. mediation, diplomacy, humanitarian aid, post-conflict transitional justice, and "on-the-ground programs." She also supports maintaining a budget that would not impede military preparedness, while investing in a "sustainable society" inclusive of the development of clean energy and green manufacturing, retrofitting buildings and bridges, economically empowering women, and educating children.

Williamson supports military engagement when a NATO ally is threatened, when the United States is under threat of attack, or "when the humanitarian order of the world is at risk."

National service
Williamson supports the creation of a program through which every citizen between 18 and 26 can perform one year of voluntary national servicehelping schools, hospitals, infrastructure, sustainability, regenerative agricultural projects, the military, the Peace Corpsthat can be remunerated for housing, "basic costs", or financial support for higher education.

Native American reconciliation
Williamson supports returning dominant control of the Black Hills to the Sioux Nation, halting construction of the Keystone Pipeline, recognizing tribal sovereignty over their territory. She also supports increasing funding to Native lands’ justice systems, protecting tribal sovereignty and governance, and protecting Native religious freedom.

Williamson has expressed support for "rethinking treaties" and continuing annual tribal nations' summits in Washington D.C.

Black American reparations
Williamson supports the distribution of $200-$500 billion in reparations for slavery, spread across 20 years for "economic and education projects," to be disbursed based on the recommendation of a selected group of black leaders. In taking this position, Williamson became the only candidate to ever submit a detailed plan for reparations for black Americans.

Williamson, who first expressed her support of reparations in her 1993 book, Illuminataadvocating that the U.S. will not reconcile its racial and economic divide without them has said of the policy proposalstates that her policy on reparations is not part of "a black agenda."

Abortion rights
Williamson supports abortion access, services and choice. She has spoken out against the Supreme Court's decision to overturn Roe v. Wade.

International and foreign issues

Climate change
Williamson deems climate change to be "the greatest moral challenge of our generation." She claimed support for the Green New Deal, immediate re-entry into the Paris Climate Accords, and has stated that she would be willing to support the Trans-Pacific Partnership if it included greater protections for workers and the environment.

Williamson also support the U.S. directing subsidies from fossil fuels, including coal, and re-investing them in the development of renewable energy, both in the U.S. and abroad, particularly in developing countries.

In 2023, Williamson endorsed the Defend The Atlanta Forest and Stop Cop City movement in Atlanta, Georgia.

Diplomacy
Williamson has called for the establishment of a Department of Peace to expand global diplomacy, mediation, and educational and economic development. She supported the creation of such a department in 2005, backing efforts by Congressman Dennis Kucinich, to try to establish it.

Afghanistan
Williamson supported safe withdrawal of all U.S. troops from Afghanistan as soon as possible and would consider the use of a peace-keeping force, such as the United Nations, to assist with the transition.

Africa
Williamson, recognizing Africa as the continent with the fastest-growing population, supports engagement with the continent in order to thwart the growth of terrorist groups and health epidemics, which she believes threaten U.S. security, while capitalizing on opportunities in areas where corruption is being reversed, free elections are being held, and economies are growing.

China
Williamson has said she supports the U.S. vigorously using its position, i.e., through CFIUS, to prevent China from buying strategically important companies, which she believes will help defend U.S. economic interests and human rights, as in the cases of the Uighurs and residents of Hong Kong.

Iran
Williamson supports rejoining the Joint Comprehensive Plan of Action (JCPOA). She said that "US propaganda ... falsely claims the deal lets Iran get nuclear weapons within 10 years." Williamson also backs increased diplomacy, a change of relations to address human rights in Iran, sanctions relief and the purchasing of Airbus airplanes to support travel, entrepreneurship and normalization. According to Williamson, "Iran is a potential ally against Sunni extremism with many common interests to build upon". Williamson criticized the Trump administration for elevating tensions with Iran.

Israeli-Palestinian conflict
Williamson supports a two-state solution to the Israeli–Palestinian conflict which secures both the legitimate security of Israel and the human rights, dignity and economic opportunities of the Palestinian people. She expressed support for using the power of the Presidency to exert pressure on Israel to restart talks on this solution.

Williamson supports rescinding President Trump's recognition of the Golan Heights as part of Israel. She has also stated her belief that settlements on the West Bank are illegal and does not support the Blockade of the Gaza Strip. However, Williamson does support the occupation of the Golan Heights "only until there is a stable government in Syria with whom one can negotiate".

Venezuela
Williamson supports creating conditions for effective dialogue between factions representing both Nicolás Maduro and Juan Guaidó that seek a peaceful transition. She has also expressed support for existing efforts to promote dialogue, in particular those being led by the Norwegian government. Williamson said she believes the best policy in Venezuela is to support efforts that allow its citizens to decide their political future, even if the U.S. does not agree with the outcome.

Religion

Williamson has called religion a map in which "the route isn't important. It's the destination that matters."

Williamson has expressed a deep belief in forgiveness based on the notion that nothing is real, or exists, but love: "If a person behaves unlovingly, then that means that, regardless if their negativityanger or whatevertheir behavior was derived from fear and doesn’t actually exist. They’re hallucinating. You forgive them, then, because there’s nothing to forgive."

Williamson believes a peaceful life is attainable by thinking with God, while thinking without God creates pain. She has said, "Asking God for help doesn’t seem very comforting if we think of Him as something outside of ourselves, or capricious, or judgmental. But God is love and He dwells within us. We were created in His image, or mind, which means that we are extensions of His love, or Sons of God."

Health and vaccinations
A "both-and" approach (both prayer and medicine) to physical and mental health has been attributed to Williamson. This approachthe efficacy of prayeraccepts medical science as part of God's power to heal. For example, surgery may be seen as God answering prayers to heal. This logic invokes what Johns Hopkins Medicine has called the "strong link between 'positivity' and health", in which "positive attitude improves outcomes and life satisfaction across a spectrum of conditions."

Williamson, who believes that "the spirit is impervious to illness," confirmed this belief when she said that "people who are prayed for get out of the emergency room faster" and "people who have been diagnosed with a life-challenging illness, who attend spiritual support groups, live, on average, twice as long after diagnosis." She maintains that prayer is complementary to medicine, not a substitute for it.

Williamson has stated her support for the necessity and value of vaccinations and antidepressants, but has been criticized for her skepticism about the pharmaceutical industry's influence in setting guidelines for how they are administered, citing her belief that their profit motive could result in harm to patients. She has also criticized overprescription of antidepressants, questioning whether antidepressants play a role in suicide, saying that the prescriptive definition between sadness and clinical depression is "artificial," and having called the process by which clinical depression is diagnosed "a scam."

During Williamson's presidential campaign, several excerpts of her past comments have conflated her skepticism of the pharmaceutical industry's trustworthiness with an embrace of anti-vaccination dogma. As a result, she has been accused of being "anti-medicine" and "anti-science." She denies such accusations, saying they "could not be further from the truth." 

Williamson has expressed frustration that her skepticism of the pharmaceutical industry has been equated with skepticism of the science of vaccines. She has said, "Skeptical about vaccinations I have not expressed. Skeptical about Big Pharma in general I have expressed. And there is a big difference." She has also expressed frustration that this distinction is lost in public discourse.

Public image

Williamson has been called such terms as "New Age guru." The label has been associated with her for years, but she has long rejected such terms, calling them "outrageous". Religious organizations have also said that she is not "New Age" but teaches an "evolved Christianityblending elements of Eastern mysticism into Christian languageusing terms 'tied to old New Age'". She has said she finds it "creepy" to be called a "spiritual leader", believes it insults her audience's intelligence, and prefers to be called an author.

Williamson has often commented on how she is portrayed in the media, and believes that her image as a "seeker" has brought ridicule in the press. During her 2014 Congressional run, Williamson said, "I’m sure they’re going to say I’m a New Age nutcase, dragon lady, lightweight thinker." She has said of her image, "There has been a tendency to create a caricature, and it’s very difficult to battle a caricature."

During her political campaigns, press outlets have called her "wacko," a "quack," "scary," "a joke," "hokey," "dangerous," "bananas," "bonkers," "Secretary of Crystals," and "wackadoodle." She made headlines when she criticized Vogue Magazine for its "insidious influence" when it did not include her in an Annie Leibovitz photo shoot of the 2020 female presidential candidates. The magazine responded that it only wanted "to highlight the five female lawmakers who bring a collective 40 years of political experience to this race." Williamson subsequently posted a fan-made picture of the Vogue photo with herself edited in.

Personal life and family
Williamson's older brother, Peter, became an immigration attorney like his father. Her late sister, Elizabeth "Jane", was a teacher. Her father, and maternal grandparents, were Russian Jewish immigrants. Her grandfather changed his surname from Vishnevetsky to Williamson after seeing "Alan Williamson Ltd" on a train. Williamson described herself as a "Jewish woman" in a 2022 interview.

She was briefly married in 1979 to a Houston businessman. She said the marriage lasted "for a minute and a half."

In 1990, she gave birth to a daughter, India Emmaline. 

In 2006, a Newsweek poll named her one of the 50 most influential baby boomers.

In 2013, Williamson reported having assets estimated to be valued between $1 million and $5 million (not including personal residences).

Works
 A Return to Love, First Edition 1992
 Imagine What America Could Be in the 21st Century: Visions of a Better Future from Leading American Thinkers
 Emma & Mommy Talk to God
 Healing the Soul of America: Reclaiming Our Voices as Spiritual Citizens
 A Woman's Worth
 Enchanted Love: The Mystical Power of Intimate Relationships
 Everyday Grace: Having Hope, Finding Forgiveness, And Making Miracles
 Illuminata: A Return to Prayer
 The Gift of Change
 The Law of Divine Compensation: On Work, Money and Miracles
 A Course in Weight Loss: 21 Spiritual Lessons for Surrendering Your Weight Forever
 Tears to Triumph: The Spiritual Journey from Suffering to Enlightenment
 A Politics of Love: A Handbook for a New American Revolution

References

External links 

 
 Marianne Williamson for President website
 Marianne Williamson, article and shows at Oprah.com
 Marianne Williamson on Politicking with Larry King
 Sister Giant
 The Peace Alliance
 Project Angel Food
 

 
1952 births
20th-century American non-fiction writers
20th-century American women writers
21st-century American non-fiction writers
21st-century American politicians
21st-century American women politicians
21st-century American women writers
A Course in Miracles
Activists from Texas
American anti-war activists
American columnists
American people of Russian-Jewish descent
American reparationists
American self-help writers
American spiritual writers
American women activists
American women columnists
Articles containing video clips
California Democrats
California Independents
Candidates in the 2014 United States elections
Candidates in the 2020 United States presidential election
Candidates in the 2024 United States presidential election
Female candidates for President of the United States
HIV/AIDS activists
Iowa Democrats
Jewish American activists
Jewish American candidates for President of the United States
Jewish American people in California politics
Jewish American writers
Living people
Nautilus Book Award winners
New Age spiritual leaders
New Age writers
New Thought clergy
New Thought writers
Newsweek people
Pomona College alumni
Progressivism in the United States
Texas Democrats
Universal basic income activists
Writers about activism and social change
Writers from Houston